Thohsaphol Sitiwatjana (born May 4, 1953) is a Thai martial artist and Muay Thai instructor. He is known as Master Toddy because after moving to the UK, people were unable to pronounce his name correctly. Thosophon has been a Muay Thai instructor since the age of 16 and has trained over 40 world champions over 5 decades. He has also featured in several movies and produced his own TV Shows.

Biography and career
Thosopon Sitiwatjana was born the son of Sophorn Sitiwatjana (Deceased) Ex-Police Chief and Sudsac Sitiwatjana. From the age of 5 years old Thosophon has been fascinated by martial arts including Tae Kwon Do and Muay Thai. By the age of 13 he had acquired a black belt in Tae Kwon Do. Thosophon trained in Muay Thai under Seri Ramaruud, Sanong Rakwanid and Pansak Ratanaprasit. At 16 years of age he was given his first chance to teach Muay Thai after his teacher fell ill and within just a few years he became head coach at his school. Thosophon started to adapt his training style including various capabilities of strength and style. He would train his own agility, skill and strength by wrestling crocodiles at the Samut Prakarn crocodile farm which was previously owned by his parents.

Muay Thai is seen by many in Thailand as being a poor man's sport and as such Thosophons' parents were opposed to him taking part in fights. Thosophon would often sneak out and take part in bare Knuckle fights on the streets of Bangkok as well as temple fights when they were offered to him.

After graduating from college Thosophon decided to audition for a role in the James Bond film "The Man with the Golden Gun". In order to get the part he fought four of six students from Bruce Lee's school of Jeet Kune Do. After beating four of the students the remaining two withdrew and thus Thosophon had gotten the part. He also gave special training to Roger Moore for his part in the film.

After filming "The Man with the Golden Gun", Thosophon made his way to England in 1975. He is widely known there as the "Father of Muay Thai" where he is widely credited with introducing Muay Thai to England. Thosophon moved to Manchester where he opened a Muay Thai Gym. There he trained many fighters such as "Kash "The Flash" Gill" and Lisa Howarth but arguably his most successful fighter was Ronnie Green who became 5 time world Muay Thai Champion under Thosophon. His gym in Manchester, England is still running today and is now owned by his younger brother (himself a highly successful Muay Thai Instructor) Master A.

In 1993, Thosophon left England and moved to Las Vegas, United States. After several failed ventures trying to introduce the art of Muay Thai to the United States of America Thosophon finally found extreme success opening "Master Toddy's U.S. Muay Thai Center". He believes that opening a gym in America has made him "a black belt in business". At one point "Master Toddy's U.S. Muay Thai Center" had up to 480 active students enrolled and he was earning up to $50000 each month. During his time in The States Thosophon trained many fighters including Gina Carano, Randy Couture and Tito Ortiz.

After spending 16 years in the U.S.A. Thosophon decided it was time to move home back to Thailand. In 2009 he did just that after purchasing land in the Samut Prakan district just south of Bangkok. The gym named "Master Toddy's Muay Thai Academy" not only trains students who want to learn the art of Muay Thai but also those wanting to become a "Kru" or teacher of Muay Thai. Both Thosophon himself and the gym he owns has been accredited by the Thai Government on several occasions

Notable fighters trained

 Kevin Ross
 Kit Cope
 Gina Carano
 Phil Baroni
 Randy Couture
 Tito Ortiz
 Stephan Bonnar
 Bob Sapp
 Chuck Lidell
 Jason David Frank
 Maurice Smith
 Dale Cook
 Melchor Menor
 Ronnie Green

Screen appearances
 2014: My Morphin' Life - Jason David Frank
 2007: Warrior Nation on MSNBC
 2006: Fight Girls
 2005: Ring Girls
 2005: Criss Angel Mindfreak
 1996: Sword Of Honour
 1974: The Man With the Golden Gun

References

External links
 

1953 births
Place of birth missing (living people)
Living people
Thohsaphol Sitiwatjana
Thohsaphol Sitiwatjana
Thohsaphol Sitiwatjana
Thohsaphol Sitiwatjana
Thohsaphol Sitiwatjana
Thohsaphol Sitiwatjana
Thohsaphol Sitiwatjana
Thohsaphol Sitiwatjana
Thohsaphol Sitiwatjana